Sir Richard Hull (1641–1693) was an Anglo-Irish politician.

Hull was a Member of Parliament for Castlemartyr in the Irish House of Commons between 1692 and 1693.

References

1641 births
1693 deaths
17th-century Anglo-Irish people
Irish knights
Irish MPs 1692–1693
Members of the Parliament of Ireland (pre-1801) for County Cork constituencies